Isla de Pascua (Easter Island) is a Chilean commune with a special regime, located within Isla de Pascua Province in Valparaíso Region. It is the only commune in Isla de Pascua Province, comprising Easter Island and Isla Salas y Gómez. Its capital is Hanga Roa, located in the southwestern area of the main island, where most of the local population resides.

Local government 
The municipality of Isla de Pascua is led by mayor Pedro Edmunds Paoa (PRO), who is accompanied in the Municipal Council by:

 Mai Teao Osorio (RN)
 Marta Hotus Tuki (PDC)
 María Icka Araki (PDC)
 Ricardo Espinoza Alvarado (PPD)
 Julio Hotus Salinas (PPD)
 Juan Haoa Hotus (Ind./Evópoli)

Notes

References

External links 

 I. Municipalidad de Isla de Pascua

Easter Island
Communes of Chile